Claire Moore may refer to:
 Claire Moore (politician), Australian politician
 Claire Moore (singer), English soprano singer and actress
 Claire Moore (cricketer), Australian cricketer
 Claire Mahl Moore, American artist

See also
 Clare Moore, Australian musician and songwriter